Texas Highways is a monthly magazine put out by the Texas Department of Transportation that, according to the agency, "promotes travel and tourism to Texas through articles and photography."

History 
Founded in May 1974 by Frank Lively, the publication was originally an internal resource for the Texas Highway Department.  Lively repurposed the magazine and by 1975 the Texas Legislature deemed Texas Highways as "This Official Travel Magazine of Texas." Lively retired in 1990, and retained an active relationship with the publication. The first issue was dedicated entirely to Native Americans in Texas, despite the opposition from the director of the Travel and Information Division at the time, who claimed "...never to devote an entire issue to one subject."

References

 .

External links
 

1974 establishments in Texas
Local interest magazines published in the United States
Magazines established in 1974
Magazines published in Austin, Texas
Monthly magazines published in the United States
State highways in Texas
Tourism magazines